ASC Ville de Dakar, commonly known simply as ASCVD, is a Senegalese basketball club based in Dakar. The team competes in the Nationale 1, the highest national level. The club was established in 1980, its men's team was founded in 2014.

History
In the 1980s, the basketball club was founded in the Abass Ndao Hospital, by the nurses and room women who worked in the structure. Dr. Pierre Moireau was the first leader of AS Ville, supported by a former basketball player named Mouhamadou Ndoye.

Women's team
In 2017, the Ville de Dakar women's team won the Senegalese Cup for the first time. In 2018, the team repeated. In 2021, the third cup title was won.

Honours
Senegalese Mayor Cup
Champions (3): 2017, 2018, 2021

References

Basketball teams in Senegal
Basketball teams established in 1980